Spit Shine Records, also known as Spit Shine International, is an American independent record label and Jamaican sound system specializing in ska, roots, and dub music. Matt Maloney, former drummer of The Allstonians, founded the label in Boston in 1999 to revitalize the underground ska and reggae scene with more of a traditional sound after the Third wave ska movement of the 1990s.

Artists
 Al "Romeo" Rosen
 The Allstonians
 Green Island
 The Harmonics
 The Larkin Brigade
 Riki Rocksteady
 Amy Ryan & The Operatives
 The Double Deckers
 Maximum Automatic
 Prince Dubplate

Discography
 Various Artists- "Leisure Riddims for the Working Class"
 Green Island- "Hit 'Em Soft & Slow"
 Various Artists- "Dubshine"
 The Harmonics- "You're Wrong" EP
 Riki Rocksteady- "Dark Dub" Cassette EP
 Al 'Romeo' Rosen- "Politics as Usual" EP
 The Double Deckers- "Showtime"
 Riki Rocksteady- "Your Official Introduction"
 Amy Ryan & The Operatives- "Don't Be Late"
 Larkin Brigade- "Paddy Keys for Mayor"

See also
 List of record labels

External links
  Official site

American independent record labels
Record labels established in 1999
Reggae record labels
Ska record labels
1999 establishments in Massachusetts